Modern Love Is Automatic is a 1981 EP by the British new wave band A Flock of Seagulls, written by Mike Score, Ali Score, Frank Maudsley and Paul Reynolds. The song of the same name was also showcased on their self-titled album the following year. The song peaked at #19 on the US Dance Club Play chart as a double A-side with Telecommunication.

Phil Spector expressed admiration for the song – as with many other tracks on the album – and at one point planned on producing the band's next album. However, this never happened due to a conflict with Jive Records and his increasingly reclusive lifestyle.

Lyrics

The song details a love-affair between a mismatched pair. As with many of the group's lyrics, harmonies and videos, there is a suggestion of cosmic energy and other-world imagery. The woman is an "automatic" perhaps symbolizing an android of some type. The man is a "cosmic" perhaps from another planet. The song closes with the man "locked away" but the narrator suggesting he is in fact free.

Track listing 

 7" Jive 8 (UK)

 12" Jive T12 (UK)

ATelecommunication produced by Bill Nelson

 12" Arista VK22001 (US)

BTanglimara produced by Steve Lovell

 7" Jive 12 (UK)

Charts

Usage in other media

The song's title was used in a 2009 independent movie.

References 

1981 debut EPs
A Flock of Seagulls albums
Jive Records EPs